Luchuena hachijoensis is a species of air-breathing land snails, terrestrial pulmonate gastropod mollusks in the family Enidae.

This species is endemic to Hachijōjima, Japan.

References

Enidae
Gastropods described in 1945
Taxa named by Nagamichi Kuroda
Taxonomy articles created by Polbot